Salcedo or Salzedo and Saucedo is a Spanish toponymic surname, of a family proceeding from the Kings of León, of which a branch passed to Portugal. It is also used through marriage and female line by the only legitimate branch and representative of the Salazar family. It is also a possible derivative of the common surname Saucedo.

It means "Of or relating to the Willow Tree".

The first people with that name were Spanish settlers who came to America from an area in Spain known as the "Valle de Salcedo" (Salcedo Valley, in the Basque Country)

The Basque version is Saratsu or Sarasua

Places
Dominican Republic
Hermanas Mirabal Province (formerly called Salcedo)
Salcedo, Dominican Republic, the capital of the Hermanas Mirabal Province 
Ecuador
Salcedo Canton, Cotopaxi Province
Salcedo, Ecuador, Capital of the Salcedo Canton
Italy
Salcedo, Italy, a commune in the province of Vicenza (Veneto)
Philippines
Salcedo, Ilocos Sur, a municipality
Salcedo, Eastern Samar, a municipality
Spain
Salcedo, Álava, a village in Lantarón municipality
United States
Salcedo, Missouri, an unincorporated community

People
Carlos Salzedo (1885–1961), French harpist, composer and conductor
Domingo Salcedo (born 1983), Paraguayan footballer
Doris Salcedo (born 1958), artist
Felipe de Salcedo (c. 1564), Spanish conquistador
José Antonio Salcedo, General of the Dominican Republic
José Ulises Macías Salcedo (born 1940), Archbishop
Juan de Salcedo (1549–1576), Spanish commander in the Philippines
Juan José de Vértiz y Salcedo (1719–1799), Spanish colonial politician
Juan Manuel de Salcedo, the last Governor of Spanish Louisiana and father of Manuel María de Salcedo
Leonard Salzedo (1921–2000), English composer and conductor
Manuel María de Salcedo (1776-1813), Governor of Spanish Texas
Mario Salcedo (born 1949 or 1950), a long-term passenger on Royal Caribbean International-branded cruise ships
Miguel de la Quadra-Salcedo (1932–2016), Spanish reporter and Olympic athlete
Santiago Salcedo (born 1981), Paraguayan footballer
Carlos Salcedo (born 1993), Mexican footballer